Francisco Galán Rodríguez (1902–1971), was a Spanish military officer.

Early life
He was the brother of Captain Fermin Galán and the Republican Majors José Maria and Juan Galán. Before the Spanish Civil War he was a lieutenant of the Spanish Civil Guard.

Spanish Civil War
In July 1936 he remained loyal to the Republican government and led one Militia column in the Somosierra front. In November 1936 he led the 3rd Mixed Brigade of the Spanish Republican Army during the Battle of Madrid. In August 1937 he was one of the Republican commanders in Asturias and in September 1937 he led the 14th Army Corps in the Asturias Campaign and on October he fled on board a fishing boat in order to avoid capture by the Nationalists. After that, in February 1938 he led the XX Corps in the Battle of Teruel, replacing Leopoldo Menéndez and he led the XII Corps during the Catalonia Offensive. On March 3, 1939, he was appointed military commander of Cartagena, but on March 4 he was arrested by the supporters of Casado during the Cartagena Uprising. On March 6 he fled from Cartagena to Bizerte on board a republican ship.

Exile
After the end of the war, he fled to Argentina and lived there until his death in 1971.

Notes

References
Beevor, Antony. (2006). The Battle for Spain. The Spanish Civil War, 1936-1939. Penguin Books. London.
Jackson, Gabriel. (1967). The Spanish Republic and the Civil War, 1931-1939. Princeton University Press. Princeton.
Thomas, Hugh. (2001). The Spanish Civil War. Penguin Books. London.

1902 births
1971 deaths
Spanish army officers
Communist Party of Spain politicians
Spanish military personnel of the Spanish Civil War (Republican faction)
Exiles of the Spanish Civil War in Argentina